Altenburger Land is a former Verwaltungsgemeinschaft ("collective municipality") in the district Altenburger Land, in Thuringia, Germany. The seat of the Verwaltungsgemeinschaft was in Mehna. It was disbanded in January 2019.

The Verwaltungsgemeinschaft Altenburger Land consisted of the following municipalities:

 Altkirchen 
 Dobitschen 
 Drogen 
 Göhren 
 Göllnitz 
 Lumpzig 
 Mehna
 Starkenberg

Former Verwaltungsgemeinschaften in Thuringia